In enzymology, a deoxycytidylate 5-hydroxymethyltransferase is an enzyme that catalyzes the chemical reaction

5,10-methylenetetrahydrofolate + H2O + deoxycytidylate  tetrahydrofolate + 5-hydroxymethyldeoxycytidylate

The 3 substrates of this enzyme are 5,10-methylenetetrahydrofolate, H2O, and deoxycytidylate, whereas its two products are tetrahydrofolate and 5-hydroxymethyldeoxycytidylate.

This enzyme belongs to the family of transferases that transfer one-carbon groups, specifically the hydroxymethyl-, formyl- and related transferases.  The systematic name of this enzyme class is 5,10-methylenetetrahydrofolate:deoxycytidylate 5-hydroxymethyltransferase. Other names in common use include dCMP hydroxymethylase, d-cytidine 5'-monophosphate hydroxymethylase, deoxyCMP hydroxymethylase, deoxycytidylate hydroxymethylase, and deoxycytidylic hydroxymethylase.  This enzyme participates in pyrimidine metabolism and one carbon pool by folate.

Structural studies

References

 

EC 2.1.2
Enzymes of known structure